Mereäärse is a village in Lääneranna Parish, Pärnu County, in southwestern Estonia, on the coast of the Gulf of Riga. It has a population of 14 (as of 1 January 2011).

Several small islets near the coast also belong to Mereäärse village: Kitselaid, Pihelga laid, Piiukaarelaid, Põntsulaid, Pööriotsalaid, Raugilaid and Selglaid.

References

Villages in Pärnu County